Edward Mordaunt Bannerman (14 January 1850 – 29 March 1923) was a Scottish international rugby and cricket player.

Bannerman was born in the parish of Old Machar, Aberdeen, to Patrick Bannerman and Anna Maria Johnston. He was educated, in England, at Clifton College, then at Edinburgh Academy.

He also played for Edinburgh Academicals.

He also played for the Scotland national cricket team, as well as at county level in England for Shropshire between 1876 and 1881 while playing at club level for Wales-based Knighton.

In 1916, his eldest son, Pte. Kenneth Mordaunt Bannerman, was killed in action in on the Somme while serving with the Lancashire Fusiliers in the First World War .

He died in Bodmin, Cornwall, England, in 1923, aged 73.

See also
 List of Scottish cricket and rugby union players

References
 Bath, Richard (ed.) The Scotland Rugby Miscellany (Vision Sports Publishing Ltd, 2007 )
 Massie, Allan A Portrait of Scottish Rugby (Polygon, Edinburgh)

External links

1850 births
1923 deaths
Cricketers from Edinburgh
Edinburgh Academicals rugby union players
Edinburgh District (rugby union) players
Cricketers from Aberdeen
Rugby union players from Edinburgh
Scotland international rugby union players
Scottish rugby union players
Rugby union players from Aberdeen